Michael Akpovie Olise (born 12 December 2001) is a professional footballer who plays as a midfielder for Premier League club Crystal Palace. Born in England, he represents France at youth international level.

Club career

Early career
Olise was a youth player at Arsenal, Chelsea (spending seven years with them before leaving aged 14), and Manchester City.

Reading
In July 2018 Olise was inducted into Reading's Academy scholarship program. He made his debut for Reading on 12 March 2019, in a 3–0 home defeat to Leeds United, and on 15 July signed a three-year professional contract with the club. He scored his first league goal for Reading on 19 September 2020, volleying home in the 76th minute with the second goal in a 2–0 win over Barnsley at the Madejski Stadium. In April 2021 he was nominated for the EFL Young Player of the Season.On 29 April 2021, he was crowned EFL Young Player of the Season.

Crystal Palace
On 8 July 2021, Olise signed a five-year deal with Premier League side Crystal Palace after they had activated his £8.37 million release clause.

On 11 September 2021, Olise made his Premier League debut for Crystal Palace in a 3-0 home win against Tottenham after coming on as a substitute in the 86th minute in place of Jordan Ayew. On 23 October 2021, Olise made his full debut for Crystal Palace in a 1-1 home draw against Newcastle United.

On 3 October 2021, Olise scored his first Premier League goal for Crystal Palace as a second half substitute in a 2–2 home draw against Leicester City. In doing so he became Palace's youngest Premier League scorer since Clinton Morrison in 1998.

International career
Olise was born in England to a Nigerian father and French-Algerian mother, and is eligible to represent France, Algeria, England or Nigeria internationally. On 27 May 2019, he was called up to the France U18 for the 2019 Toulon Tournament. He made his debut on 2 June 2019, against Qatar U23. In March 2021, Olise was named as a standby for the Nigeria squad taking part in their Africa Cup of Nations qualifiers against Benin and Lesotho.

In March 2022, Olise was called up to the France under-21 team for the first time and made his debut in the side's 2–0 win over the Faroe Islands under-21 team on 24 March.

Style of play

Olise is a left-footed attacking midfielder who can play as a number 10, or either side of this position as a left or right-sided attacking midfielder. He is noted for his ability to quickly play passes that carve open defences. His first touch is good and has a good awareness of what is happening around him. Olise has a good range of passing which he can use often to play in behind the opposition defence or switch the angle of attack. He likes to operate 50 to 30 yards out from goal in the right half-space, where he can use various options to continue the attack.

On the ball, Olise is an agile and mobile player. He is capable of turning quickly with good acceleration and change of pace, even when he is dribbling in very tight spaces or running with the ball.

Personal life
Olise's younger brother Richard is also a footballer and joined Chelsea as an Under-9, representing England at youth level.

Career statistics

Honours 
Individual

 EFL Championship Young Player of the Season: 2020–21

 EFL Championship Team of the Season: 2020–21
 Premier League Goal of the Month: January 2023
 PFA Team of the Year: 2020–21 Championship
 Reading Scholar of the Season 2018−19

References

External links
Profile at the Crystal Palace F.C. website
 

2001 births
Living people
Footballers from Hammersmith
English footballers
French footballers
France youth international footballers
Association football midfielders
Arsenal F.C. players
Chelsea F.C. players
Manchester City F.C. players
Reading F.C. players
Crystal Palace F.C. players
English Football League players
Premier League players
French people of Nigerian descent
French sportspeople of Algerian descent
English people of French descent
English people of Nigerian descent
English people of Algerian descent
Black French sportspeople
Black British sportsmen